The Marwanids or Dustakids (983/990-1085) were a Kurdish Sunni Muslim dynasty in the Diyar Bakr region of Upper Mesopotamia (present day northern Iraq/southeastern Turkey) and Armenia, centered on the city of Amid (Diyarbakır).

Territory
The Marwanid realm in the Diyar Bakr region of Upper Mesopotamia (present day northern Iraq/southeastern Turkey) and Armenia, centered on the city of Amid (Diyarbakır). They also ruled over Akhlat, Bitlis, Manzikert, Nisibis, Erciş, Muradiye, Siirt, Cizre, Hasankayf, and temporarily ruled over Mosul and Edessa.

History

Origins
According to most academic sources, the Marwanids were a Kurdish dynasty. The Encyclopaedia of Iran considers them as an Arab dynasty in one article, and refers to them as a Kurdish dynasty in another article. The Marwanids were Sunni Muslims.

The founder of the dynasty was a shepherd, Abu Shujā Badh ibn Dustak. He left his cattle, took up arms and became a valiant chief of war, obtaining popularity. When a member of the Buyid dynasty, Adud al-Dawla, who ruled Iraq, died in 983, Badh took Mayyāfāriqīn. He also conquered Diyarbakır, as well as a variety of urban sites on the northern shores of Lake Van.

During the rebellion of Bardas Phokas the Younger in the Byzantine Empire, Bādh took advantage of the chaotic political situation to conquer the plain of Mush in Taron, an Armenian princedom annexed by the Byzantine Empire in 966.

Abu Ali Al-Hasan ibn Marwān

Elias of Nisibis, a Syriac chronicler, discussed the life of Abu ‘Ali al-Hasan. After the death of his uncle Badh, the elder son of Marwan came back to Hisn-Kayfa, and married the widow of the old warrior chief. He fought the last Hamdanids, confused them and retook all the fortresses. Elias related the tragic end of this prince who was killed in Amid (Diyarbakır) in 997 by rebellious inhabitants. His brother Abu Mansur Sa’id succeeded him under the name of Mumahhid al-Dawla. In 992, after Badh's death and a series of Byzantine punitive raids around Lake Van, Emperor Basil II (r. 976–1025)  was able to negotiate a lasting peace with the Kurdish emirate.

Mumahhid al-Dawla Sa'id

Mumahhid, a skilful diplomat, made use of the Byzantines' ambitions. The relations of this prince with Emperor Basil II were quite friendly. When Basil learnt of the murder of the Georgian potentate David III of Tao, who had left his kingdom to the Byzantine Empire by testament, he stopped the campaign that he had begun in Syria to ensure the Arabian emirs' obedience and crossed the Euphrates. He annexed David's state, received Mumahhid al-Dawla with honours and made peace with him.  Mumahhid al-Dawla took advantage of the peace to restore the walls of his capital Maïpherqat (Mayyafariqin), where an inscription still commemorates this event.

In 1000 when Basil II travelled from Cilicia to the lands of David III Kuropalates (Akhlat and Manzikert), Mumahhid al-Dawla came to offer his submission to the emperor and in return he received the high rank of magistros and doux of the East.

Sharwin ibn Muhammad, usurper
In 1010, Mumahhid al-Dawla was assassinated by his ghulam, Sharwin ibn Muhammad, who assumed rulership. He legitimized his rule with the ancient rule that whoever kills the ruler becomes himself the successor. However this archaic rule and Sharwin's rule were soon contested, and Sharwin was overthrown. Coins are known from his brief reign.

Nasr al-Dawla Ahmad ibn Marwan

Nasr al-Dawla was the third son of Marwan to ascend the throne. A clever politician, he skilfully navigated between the surrounding great powers: the Buyid emir Sultan al-Dawla, the Fatimid caliph of Egypt al-Hakim and Basil II. Elias of Nisibis has written that Nasr al-Dawla Ahmad ibn Marwan, "the victorious emir", subdued Ibn Dimne, his vassal in Diyarbakır, in 1011. He signed with the Byzantine Empire a pact of mutual non-aggression, but violated it once or twice. The renown of this Kurdish Muslim prince grew so much that the inhabitants of al-Ruha (Edessa, present-day Sanli Urfa), at the west, called him to free them from an Arab chief. Nasr al-Dawla took the city of Edessa in 1026, and added it to his possessions. This event has been reported by the famous western Syriac author Bar Hebraeus (1226–1286).  So Nasr al-Dawla annexed Edessa, but the city was retaken by the Byzantine general George Maniakes in 1031. In 1032 he sent an army of 5000 horsemen, under the command of his general Bal, to re-take the town from Arab tribes supported by Byzantium. The Kurdish commander Bal took the city and killed the Arab tribal chief, then he wrote to his lord, asking for reinforcements, "if you want to save your Lordship on Kertastan (Kurdistan)". Al-Ruha was finally captured again by Byzantines in 1033.

The long rule of Nasr al-Dawla represented the apogee of Marwanid power. He built a new citadel on a hill of Mayyafariqin where the Church of the Virgin stood, and also constructed bridges and public baths, and restored the observatory. Some libraries were established in the mosques of Mayyafarikin and Amid. He invited well-known scholars, historians and poets to his royal court, among them Ibn al-Athir, Abd Allah al-Kazaruni, and al-Tihami. He sheltered political refugees such as the future Abbasid caliph al-Muqtadi (1075–1099). In 1054 he had to acknowledge Toghrul Beg the Seljuq as his own liege, who ruled the largest part of the Jazira, but he kept his territories. This fine period of peace and good feelings between Kurds and Syriacs was rich in cultural creations. It enjoyed extensive trade, vibrant arts and crafts, and an impressive history. Nasr al-Dawla left monumental inscriptions in Diyarbakır that show still now the artistic brightness of his reign.

Twilight

After Nasr al-Dawla's death, the Marwanids' power declined. His second son, Nizam, succeeded him and ruled until 1079, then followed his son Nasir al-Dawla Mansur. The end of the Marwanid dynasty came about by treason. Ibn Jahir, a former vizier, left the Diyar Bakr and went to Baghdad. There, he convinced the Seljuq sultan Malik Shah I (1072–1092), a grand-nephew of Toghrul Beg, and the famous vizier Nizam al-Mulk, to allow him to assault Mayyafarikin. When the city was taken, Ibn Jahir took the Marwanids' great treasures for himself. Henceforth, the Diyar Bakr fell almost entirely under the direct rule of the Seljuks. The last emir, Nasir al-Dawla Mansur, kept only the city of Jazirat Ibn ‘Umar (present-day Cizre in south-eastern Turkey). The roots of the Badikan tribe go back to Badh ibn dustak the founder of the Marwanids. This tribe continues its existence in the provinces of Muş, Silvan and Diyarbakır in Turkey. The Malabadi Bridge in Silvan, Diyarbakır takes its name from Bad, the founder of the Marvanids. Malabadi means (house of Bad) in Kurdish.

List of Marwanid rulers
Abu Shujā' Badh ibn Dustak (983/990–991)
Al-Hasan ibn Marwān (991–997)
Mumahhid al-Dawla Sa’īd (997–1010)
Sharwin ibn Muhammad (1010), usurper
Nasr al-Dawla Ahmad ibn Marwān (1011–1061)
Nizām al-Dawla Nasr (1061–1079)
Nasir al-Dawla Mansur (1079–1085)

See also
 Dicle Bridge, a ten-arch bridge built in 1065
 List of Kurdish dynasties

References

Sources
 
Bar Hebraeus, Chronique universelle, Mukhtassar al-Duwal, Beirut.
Chronography of Elias bar Shinaya, Metropolitan of Nisibe, edited and translated into French by L .J. Delaporte, Paris, 1910.
al-Fāriqī, Ahmad b. Yûsuf b. `Alī b. al-Azraq, Tārīkh al-fāriqī (ed. Badawī `Abd al-Latīf `Awwad). Beirut: Dār al-Kitāb al-Lubnānī, 1984. English summary by H. F. Amedroz, "The Marwanid dynasty at Mayyafariqin in the tenth and eleventh centuries AD", Journal of the Royal Asiatic Society 1903, pp. 123–154.

Further reading
Blaum, P., "A History of the Kurdish Marwanid Dynasty (983-1085), Part I", Kurdish Studies: An International Journal, Vol.5, No.1-2, Spring/Fall 1992, pp. 54–68.
Blaum, P., "A History of the Kurdish Marwanid Dynasty (983-1085), Part II", Kurdish Studies: An International Journal, Vol.6, No.1-2, Fall 1993, pp. 40–65.
Ripper, Thomas. Die Marwāniden von Diyār Bakr. Eine kurdische Dynastie im islamischen Mittelalter. Würzburg: Ergon Verlag, 2000.
Stefan Heidemann: A New Ruler of the Marwanid Emirate in 401/1010 and Further Considerations on the Legitimizing Power of Regicide. In: Aram 9-10 (1997-8), pp. 599-615.

External links
Waqf inscription from Nasr al-Dawla; Jerusalem
The Kurdish Marwanid princes and Syriac scholars, by Ephrem-Isa Yousif.
The Kurdish Marwanid princes and Syriac scholars
Basil II, in An Online Encyclopedia of Roman Emperors, by Catherine Holmes, 2003.

Kurdish dynasties
Medieval Upper Mesopotamia
Sunni dynasties
11th century in the Middle East